The Phrynosomatidae are a diverse family of lizards, sometimes classified as a subfamily (Phrynosomatinae), found from Panama to the extreme south of Canada. Many members of the group are adapted to life in hot, sandy deserts, although the spiny lizards prefer rocky deserts or even relatively moist forest edges, and the short-horned lizard lives in prairie or sagebrush environments. The group includes both egg-laying and viviparous species, with the latter being more common in species living at high elevations.

The earliest fossil remains of this group are known from the Late Cretaceous of Mongolia and belong to the genus Desertiguana. As phrynosomatids are presently known only from North America, these remains indicate that phrynosomatids likely had a wider distribution in prehistoric times.

Genera
The Phrynosomatidae are organised into 9 genera in this family.

The earless taxa (Cophosaurus and Holbrookia) are sister genera.

Family Phrynosomatidae
 Callisaurus Blainville, 1835 – zebra-tailed lizards
 Cophosaurus Troschel, 1852 – greater earless lizards
 Holbrookia Girard, 1851 – earless lizards
 Petrosaurus Boulenger, 1885 – California rock lizards
 Phrynosoma Wiegmann, 1828 – horned lizards 
 Sceloporus Wiegmann, 1828 – spiny lizards (or sator)
 Uma Baird, 1859 – fringe-toed lizards 
 Urosaurus Hallowell, 1854 – tree and brush lizards
 Uta Baird & Girard, 1852 – side-blotched lizards

References

External links

 Phrynosomatidae Family

 
Lizard families